Neopithecops zalmora, the Quaker, is a small butterfly found in South Asia and Southeast Asia that belongs to the lycaenids or blues family.

Subspecies
The subspecies of Neopithecops zalmora  are-

 Neopithecops zalmora zalmora Butler, 1870 – north-east India, Myanmar
 Neopithecops zalmora dharma Moore, 1881 – Sri Lanka, south India
 Neopithecops zalmora andamanus Eliot & Kawazoé, 1983 – Andamans

Description

Wet-season form
Upperside of both sexes dark purplish brown; in the female slightly paler on the disc of the forewing. In most specimens, but not in all, the male also has the disc of the forewing similarly paler. Underside; white. Forewing: apex dusky brown, apices of veins 10, 11 and 12 with a minute black dot; no discal markings, but the discocellulars picked out with a short, very slender, obscure brown line; a postdiscal, irregular, transverse series of slender brown lunules, followed by a transverse, very slender, sinuous brown line, the white ground colour in the interspaces beyond centred by a subterminal series of transverse black spots.

Hindwing: discocellulars with a short brown line similar to that on the forewing, followed by a subdorsal small round black spot, and a subcostal much larger similar spot; between these two spots is a curved, very irregular line of detached pale ashy-brown lunules; the subterminal markings very similar to those on the forewing. Cilia of forewing dusky brown, of hindwing white. Antenna, head, thorax and abdomen dark brown; the antenna on the inner side speckled with white; beneath; the palpi, thorax and abdomen white.

Dry-season form

Differs from specimens of the wet-season brood as follows:

Upperside: ground colour not so dark generally. Forewing: a large oval snow-white spot placed obliquely on the disc. Hindwing: apex and disc irregularly white; on the posterior half the ground colour a shade darker than on the anterior half.

Underside: ground colour and markings similar to those of specimens of the wet-season brood, but the markings very much paler and fainter; in specimens taken in the middle of the dry season in exceptionally dry localities these markings are altogether absent. Antennae, head, thorax and abdomen on the upperside paler than in the wet-season brood.

Distribution
India: Eastern Himalayas; Bengal: Orissa; Western Ghats; Sri Lanka; Assam; Myanmar; Tenasserim; the Andamans; extending into the Malay Peninsula.

Food plants

The larvae are known to feed on Diospyros (Ebenaceae) and many species of Glycosmis (Rutaceae) including G. arborea, G. parviflora and G. pentaphylla.

Gallery

See also
List of butterflies of India (Lycaenidae)

References

External links

Polyommatini
Butterflies of Asia